George A. Maier (1926 – February 2015) was an American football player and coach. He served as the head coach at Iona College from 1970 to 1971 before being named the offensive coordinator at Fordham University in 1972. In 1973, he became the head coach of the club football team at Pace University and shepherded that team to varsity status in 1978.  Maier resigned following the 1988 season.  He also coached football at Rye High School in Rye, New York. 

Maier died in 2015.

Head coaching record

Club

Varsity

References

1926 births
2015 deaths
Fordham Rams football coaches
Iona Gaels football coaches
Pace Setters football coaches
High school football coaches in New York (state)
Sportspeople from Westchester County, New York